The Arduin Adventure is a 1981 role-playing game published by Grimoire Games.

Contents
The Arduin Adventure is an introduction to fantasy role-playing / adventure gaming.

Arduin Adventure is an introductory Arduin set, including a simplified version of the Arduin Grimoire trilogy using the 2nd-edition rules.

Publication history
Arduin Adventure was written by David A. Hargrave, with a cover by Greg Espinoza, and was published by Grimoire Games in 1981 as a boxed set containing a 64-page book, three cardstock artifact sheets, three character sheets, and dice; the 64-page book was also sold separately.

The Arduin Adventure was originally planned for release in Christmas of 1980, but it ran into a setback when the typesetters refused to lay out the game's numerous tables, so it was not until early 1981 that the game actually appeared. While the Arduin Grimoires depended on the original Dungeons & Dragons game as the foundation of its own mechanics, The Arduin Adventure turned Arduin into a truly standalone game system.  The Arduin Adventure focused on teaching roleplaying to novice gamers.

Reception
Clayton Miner reviewed The Arduin Adventure for Pegasus magazine #3 (1981), and stated that "The Arduin Adventure is a project that shows a lot of thought and effort before production, and is definitely a useful item for any gamer who is brand new to role player. This item may even be useful for more experienced gamers who are interested in using the Arduin Trilogy, but are having problems understanding new rules."

John T. Sapienza, Jr. reviewed The Arduin Adventure for Different Worlds magazine and stated that "it supplies good ideas on how to role-play and how to GM, and that plus the elaborate scenario of the wizard's tower make this a good buy for those who have already been exposed to adventure gaming, and are looking for more gaming aids to help them get started at it themselves."

Mike Kardos reviewed The Arduin Adventure in The Space Gamer No. 52. Kardos commented that "I would recommend Arduin to those who would like to add some of the rules to their campaign. For a few more dollars, you could buy a better and more complete fantasy role-playing game."

Shannon Appelcline commented that The Arduin Adventure, one of the two final, professional, boxed products, contributed to Grimoire Games "looking like a gaming company really finding its feet. However, The Arduin Adventure was something more: it marked a new direction for Arduin itself." He noted that "This product also fulfilled some of Hargrave's desire for a 'new game' that he'd written about when he finished The Runes of Doom. He hadn't wanted to get away from Arduin so much as from D&D. Though the Arduin Adventure game system was still clearly D&D-derived, it was a first step away that introduced some new rules, most notably a totally new initiative system called 'CF' (coordination factor). This movement away from D&D was a path that Hargrave would continue walking for the rest of his life." He felt that "The general organization of The Arduin Adventure — with one and two-page chapters each covering a basic concept — was quite innovative and definitely ahead of its time." Appelcline concluded that "The Arduin Adventure wasn't well-received by the industry at the time. By 1980 or 1981, a bare-bones not-quite-retroclone of OD&D wasn't that exciting — except to Arduin players, of course, who had long needed this skeleton to hang their games upon. If anything, the reception has cooled since then. Whereas The Arduin Trilogy is still appreciated and respected for its gonzo imagination and the Arduin Dungeons for their unforgiving nature, The Arduin Adventure is very much an artifact of its time."

References

Arduin
Fantasy role-playing games